Francis Thomas de Grey Cowper, 7th Earl Cowper  (11 June 1834 – 18 July 1905), known as Viscount Fordwich from 1837 to 1856, was a British Liberal politician. He was Lord Lieutenant of Ireland from 1880 to 1882.

Overwhelmingly by inheritance he was rendered a sterling millionaire, a threshold reached by his own death estate which is estimated to apply to seven other British residents per year, only, in 1905.

Background
Cowper (pronounced "Cooper") was the eldest son of George Cowper, 6th Earl Cowper, by his wife Anne de Grey, 7th holder of the barony of Lucas of Crudwell, daughter of Thomas de Grey, 2nd Earl de Grey. He was educated at Harrow School and the University of Oxford.

He was commissioned a cornet in the Yorkshire Hussars on 19 February 1852. On 22 November 1855, his father appointed him a deputy lieutenant of Kent.

Political career
Cowper entered the House of Lords on his father's death in 1856 and served under William Ewart Gladstone as Captain of the Honourable Corps of Gentlemen-at-Arms (Government Chief Whip in the House of Lords) from 1871 to 1874 and as Lord Lieutenant of Ireland from 1880 to 1882. He became a Knight of the Garter in 1865 and was admitted to the Privy Council in 1871.

Other public positions
Apart from his political career Cowper held the position of Lord Lieutenant of Bedfordshire between 1861 and 1905. He was also a Deputy Lieutenant of Nottinghamshire and Kent.

Peerages
In 1871, Cowper managed to obtain a reversal of the attainder of the Scottish lordship of Dingwall and the English barony of Butler, which had been under attainder since 1715, and he became the 4th Lord Dingwall and the 3rd Baron Butler as well. In 1880, he succeeded his mother as 8th Baron Lucas.

Relative wealth
He came to own more than £1M of assets which Sir Leo Chiozza Money, an analyst of the rich of the era, estimated was true of only eight British people who died "in an average year". In the US, a concentration of greater wealth existed: by the start of the World War I, Rockefeller had become the world's first billionaire estimated (in somewhat cheaper US dollars), in the year he died.

Family
Lord Cowper married Lady Katrine Compton, daughter of William Compton, 4th Marquess of Northampton, in 1870. The marriage was childless. Cowper died in July 1905, aged 71. On his death, the baronetcy of Ratlingcourt, barony of Cowper, viscountcy of Fordwich and earldom of Cowper became extinct. He was succeeded in the barony of Lucas of Crudwell and the lordship of Dingwall by his nephew, Auberon.

Because Lord Cowper died childless and there were no other male-line descendants of the first Earl Cowper at the time of his death, his wealth stated mainly devolved to issue of his three married sisters (Lady Florence Herbert, Lady Adine Fane and Lady Amabel Kerr)  
Florence's son, Auberon, succeeded his uncle in the barony of Lucas of Crudwell and the lordship of Dingwall and also inherited the de Grey part of the Cowper estates including Wrest Park in Bedfordshire
Adine's daughter and only surviving child, Ethel, being Lord Cowper's ward and favourite niece, inherited Panshanger, the Cowper's main country seat in Hertfordshire
Amabel's descendants, who later succeeded as Marquesses of Lothian, inherited the Melbourne part of the Cowper estates including Brocket Hall in Hertfordshire and Melbourne Hall in Derbyshire

References

	

|-

|-

|-

Earls Cowper
Princes of the Holy Roman Empire
Knights of the Garter
Lord-Lieutenants of Bedfordshire
Lords Lieutenant of Ireland
1834 births
1905 deaths
Honourable Corps of Gentlemen at Arms
Yorkshire Hussars officers
Deputy Lieutenants of Kent
Members of the Privy Council of the United Kingdom
Barons Lucas
People educated at Harrow School
Francis